The Huawei Honor X series is a line of mid-range smartphones produced by Huawei through its sub-brand Honor.

Phones

Huawei Honor 3X

Huawei Honor 4X

Huawei Honor 5X 

The Huawei Honor 5X was first announced in late 2015. It is also known as the Huawei GR5.

Huawei Honor 6X 

The Huawei Honor 6X was originally announced in October 2016.

 Storage: 32 or 64 GB
 RAM: 3 or 4 GB
 Battery: 3340 mAH

Huawei Honor 7X 

The Huawei Honor 7X was first announced in China in October 2017. In December 2017, it was announced for international markets.

See also 
Huawei Mate series

References 

Android (operating system) devices
Huawei Honor